Remigio Fernández (born 1 October 1965 in Asunción, Paraguay) is a Paraguayan football manager and former Paraguayan footballer who played in clubs of Paraguay and Chile.

Teams
  Olimpia 1980-1991
  Deportes Antofagasta 1992-1993
  Olimpia 1994-1995

Titles
  Olimpia 1980, 1981, 1982, 1983, 1985, 1988, 1989 and 1995 (Paraguayan Primera División Championship), 1990 (Copa Libertadores de América and Supercopa Sudamericana), 1991 (Recopa Sudamericana)

References 

1965 births
Living people
Paraguayan footballers
Paraguayan expatriate footballers
Club Olimpia footballers
C.D. Antofagasta footballers
Chilean Primera División players
Expatriate footballers in Chile
Association footballers not categorized by position